Wrinkly Face Provincial Park is a provincial park 16 kilometres north of Winfield in British Columbia, Canada.

History
The park was established May 20, 2004.

Geography
The park is 43 hectares in size. It encompasses a southern-facing cliff along with a series of dry meadows above the cliff and wetter meadows below. The cliff edge provides views of Okanagan Lake and the land toward Kelowna. The High Rim Trail passes through the park along the upper edge of the cliff.

Conservation
The primary role of Wrinkly Face Park is to protect the series of dry meadows at the top of the cliff and the wetter meadows at its base, along with the interior Douglas fir forest. The dry, seasonally-wet, diverse meadows are extremely fragile. Five red/blue-listed vascular plants are known to occur including red-listed Obscure Cryptantha (Cryptantha ambigua) and Needleleaved Navarretia (Navarretia intertexta) and blue-listed Northern Linanthus (Linanthus
septentrionalis), False-mermaid (Floerkea proserpinacoides) and Awned Cyperus (Cyperus
squarrosus).

Recreation
Wrinkly Face Park provides low-impact recreational opportunities, such as hiking or horseback riding, for nature study and contains part of the regionally-significant 50 km long High Rim Trail.

Rock climbing is also possible here, with upwards of 21 established climbs on basalt cliffs.

Images

See also
List of British Columbia Provincial Parks
List of Canadian provincial parks

External links
Rock climbing route info at RockClimbing.com

References

Provincial parks of British Columbia
Regional District of Central Okanagan
Provincial parks in the Okanagan